Jordi Carrillo de Albornoz Torres (born 28 August 1984), better known as Jordi Wild, is a Spanish YouTuber and podcaster. His YouTube channel, El Rincón de Giorgio, was created in March 2013, and in 2017 it got 7 million subscribers, he currently has more than 12 million subscribers.

He published three books entitled "Sueños de Acero y Neón", "Jorgemyte, agente de la PEM", and "Así es la puta vida". Jordi Wild currently runs a series of podcasts known as "The Wild Project", for which he won the 2022 Esland Award for the Best Talk Show. The podcast has also received multiple positive reviews, interviewing numerous well-known people in different fields, including: Oriol Junqueras, Iker Jiménez, Gervasio Deferr, Gerard Piqué, Andrés Iniesta, Arturo Pérez-Reverte, Ibai Llanos, Nacho Vidal, Cristina Gutiérrez, El Rubius, A-Kid, Frank Cuesta, Brandon Moreno, Alejandro Cao de Benós, Jordi ENP, Josep Pedrerol, Willyrex, Juan Espino, Dross, Siro López, Antoni Daimiel, Kira Sensei, Darma, and he is writing the next one which will release in March 2023.

Biography 
Jordi Carrillo de Albornoz Torres was born on August 28, 1984 in Manresa, Catalonia, Spain. Jordi created his YouTube channel, El Rincón de Giorgio in March 2013, however, his oldest video dates back to August of that same year. During his career as a YouTuber he has collaborated with other YouTubers such as Luzuvlogs, Zorman and AuronPlay. In 2016, he published a short film entitled Wild: la pelicula (Wild: the movie), and in 2017, he left YouTube during a while. Later he returned with a gangsta rap video clip known as "YouTube: Estado Crítico" (YouTube: Critical State), in collaboration with rapper Dante.

In 2018, he made the script and participated in the casting of VENDETTA: La Película (VENDETTA: The Movie), and in October 2019 he participated in the cast of a short film called Ella llevaba una diadema azul (She was wearing a Blue Diadem), and in 2020 he started an interview podcast series known as The Wild Project, in an interview on the RockZone website, he stated that he was inspired by the Joe Rogan podcasts, and was flattered that they called him the "Spanish Joe Rogan". The Wild Project has almost always been in the fourth position of the list of the most listened to Spanish podcasts on Spotify in 2021, and on December 28 he top the list of Spotify. In January 2022, Jordi Wild's The Wild Project won the Best Talk Show of the year category from Esland Awards, at Palau de la Música Catalana, Barcelona. In June 2022, he celebrated his 150th episode of his podcast with a special episode that lasted 25 hours. In 2022 he released his first fragrance under the name of 'Olvidona'.

Personal life 
Jordi in 2014 started a relationship with Natalipa, who was chosen in a contest known as "Novia del Canal" (Bride of the Channel), in which Jordi chose the girl who seemed most beautiful to him. In 2019 they ended their relationship and currently Jordi is in a relationship with another girl.

Awards and nominations

Filmography

References

External links 
 El Rincón de Giorgio's channel on YouTube
 Official website
 Jordi Wild at IMDb

1984 births
Spanish YouTubers
Spanish-language YouTubers
People of Catalan descent
Spanish writers
Living people
People from Manresa
YouTube podcasters